Les Dragueurs is a 1959 French drama film directed by Jean-Pierre Mocky. British actor Belinda Lee plays a role.

It is also known as The Chasers (US title), The Girl Hunters, or The Young Have No Morals.

Premise
Two young men, Freddy and Joseph, go out looking for girls one nigh, hoping to find the right girl. They go through a number of different experiences and encounters. Among the women they meet: Denise, who is married, but looking for romance; Sylviane, who clings to old dreams and boyfriends; Dadou, Sylviane's harsh roommate; Ghislaine; a disillusioned hard partier; a bobby soxer; Jeanne, a cripple.

Cast 
 Jacques Charrier as Freddy
 Charles Aznavour as Joseph Bouvier
 Dany Robin as Denise
 Dany Carrel as Dadou
 Estella Blain as Sylviane
 Anouk Aimée as Jeanne
 Belinda Lee as Ghislaine
 Nicole Berger as Françoise
 Véronique Nordey as La bobby-soxer
 Ingeborg Schöner as Monica 
 Margit Saad as Ingrid
 Gérard Darrieu as Un ami de Freddy

Production
It was one of a series of sexually aggressive characters Belinda Lee played in European movies.

Reception
Variety said the director "has  filled this with some fairly acute  observation on pickups and Paris  nightlife, with a wild party also thrown in. It is sometimes sketchy and one-track but has exploitation  handles on its looksee of Paris at night." The reviewer added that he felt the two leads "give body to the roles of the two searchers. The women remain facets of the female pysche. However, they are all lookers and dress up the pic. Technical credits and production values are fine, with on-the-spot lensing a help. This is an offbeater with  possibilities for offshore specialized programs.

The film was released in New York in 1960 as The Chasers. The New York Times called it "a bittersweet, faintly tragic and sardonic romantic drama. However, as inventive, striking fare it is, basically, just another  ripple in the veritable inundation of 'new wave' of features turned out by France's youthful filmmakers."

The Monthly Film Bulletin said it "had its points of interest."

It was released in LA in 1963 as The Girl Chasers.

References

External links 

Les Drageurs at BFI

1959 drama films
1959 films
French drama films
1950s French-language films
Films directed by Jean-Pierre Mocky
1950s French films